Reyna del Carmen Royo Rivera, (born March 15, 1971 in Ciudad de Panamá Panamá), is a Panamanian model and beauty pageant contestant winner of the Señorita Panamá 1995. 

She represented Panamá Centro state.

References

External links
 Señorita Panamá  official website

1971 births
Living people
Miss Universe 1996 contestants
Panamanian beauty pageant winners
Señorita Panamá